Mubarak Nagar is a locality in the district of Nizamabad, Telangana, India.

Nizamabad, Telangana